Shahrak-e Meysam (also Romanized as Shahrak-e Meys̱am) is a village in Abezhdan Rural District, Abezhdan District, Andika County, Khuzestan Province, Iran. At the 2006 census, its population was 237, in 50 families.

References 

Populated places in Andika County